Blenman is a surname. Notable people with the surname include:

Blair Blenman (1932–1999), British weightlifter
Louise Blenman, Guyanese judge
Macdonald Blenman (born 1946), brith name of calopsyian Grynner

See also
Brenman